A memorial is an object served as a memory of something.

Memorial may also refer to:

Common uses
Memorial service, a ceremony performed in remembrance of a dead person
Online memorial, an Internet site set up to remember someone who has died
War memorial, an edifice to commemorate those who died, or were injured, in war

Places
Memorial, Houston, Texas
Memorial Bridge (disambiguation), various locations

Arts, entertainment, and media

Music 
Memorial (Clifford Brown album), 1956
Memorial (Distorted album), an album by the Israeli metal band Distorted, or the title track
Memorial (Moonspell album), a 2006 album by the Portuguese metal band Moonspell
Memorial (Russian Circles album), 2013, or the title track
Memorial (composition), a composition by Michael Nyman
Memorial Album (Hank Williams album)

Television
"Memorial" (Star Trek: Voyager) an episode of the television series Star Trek: Voyager
"Memorial" (The Vampire Diaries), an episode of the television series The Vampire Diaries
Memorials (TV series), a 2020 South Korean television series

Other uses in arts, entertainment, and media
Mémorial, the official gazette of Luxembourg
Memorial: Letters from American Soldiers, a 1991 documentary film
The Memorial, a 1932 novel by Christopher Isherwood
Memorial (novel), a 2020 novel by Bryan Washington

Groups and organizations 
Memorial (society), an international society in memory and for rehabilitation of victims of political repression in the USSR
Memorial Sloan–Kettering Cancer Center, a cancer treatment and research institution in New York City
Memorial University of Newfoundland, a university located in St. John's, Newfoundland and Labrador, Canada
OBD Memorial, online data of Soviet personnel killed or missing in or after the Second World War

Other uses
Memorial (liturgy), a feast day of rank lower than a solemnity or feast
Memorial Tournament, a PGA Tour golf tournament founded by Jack Nicklaus
 Memorials were the original deeds registered and held  by the South Australian General Registry Office in the early days of the colony

See also
 In Memoriam (disambiguation)
 Memorial Day
 Memorial Park (disambiguation)
 Memory (disambiguation)
 Remembrance (disambiguation)